George Oscar Alcorn  (May 3, 1850 – February 16, 1930) was a Canadian lawyer and politician.

Born in Lennoxville, Canada East, (now Sherbrooke, Quebec), the son of Thomas Coke Alcorn and Martha A. Bartlett, he was educated at the Toronto Grammar and Model Grammar Schools. A lawyer, he was admitted to the bar in 1871 and was created a King's Counsel in 1890. He practised law in Belleville, Ontario and Picton, Ontario. He was president of the Prince Edward Liberal-Conservative Association.

He was first elected to the House of Commons of Canada for the Ontario riding of Prince Edward in the 1900 federal election. A Conservative, he was re-elected in the 1904 election but was defeated in the 1908 election.

In 1872, he married Sara Jane Leavitt. In 1910, Alcorn was named Master in Ordinary for the Supreme Court of Ontario and served in that post until 1923.

References
 The Canadian Parliament: Biographical Sketches and Photo-Engravures of the Senators and Members of the House of Commons of Canada

1850 births
1930 deaths
Conservative Party of Canada (1867–1942) MPs
Members of the House of Commons of Canada from Ontario
Politicians from Sherbrooke
Anglophone Quebec people
Canadian King's Counsel